Open Road is a 2012 American-Brazilian thriller drama film directed by Marcio Garcia. The film follows the story of Angie, a young Brazilian artist who travels to the United States in a journey of self-discovery. Arriving in the United States, she rents a car and starts running through the streets, and meets Chuck, a street dweller.

Background
The movie is a co-production between Brazil and the U.S. Belle, whose mother is Brazilian and father is American, didn't have any trouble preparing for her role of Angie. 
Her character also has parents from both countries, just like in her real life. 
Belle feels that is important for her to promote the Brazilian culture overseas.

Casting

References

External links
 
 

American thriller drama films
Brazilian thriller drama films
2010s Portuguese-language films
2010s English-language films
Films shot in Vitória, Espírito Santo
2012 thriller drama films
2012 films
2012 drama films
American multilingual films
Brazilian multilingual films
2010s American films